Abdelhakim Laref (born 12 January 1985) is a Belgian footballer of Algerian origin. He currently plays for SK Sint-Niklaas in Belgium.

Club career
Laref came up through the junior ranks of Standard Liège. He played for K.S.V. Roeselare in the Belgian First Division, as well as various other Belgian clubs, including FCN Sint-Niklaas, Germinal Beerschot, R.A.A. Louviéroise, K.F.C. Eendracht Zele, K.M.S.K. Deinze and K.A.A. Gent .

JSM Béjaïa
On 2 June 2010, Laref signed a contract with the Algerian Championnat National side JSM Béjaïa. He scored his first goal on 9 November 2010 at ORB Akbou with JSM Bejaia. On 25 January 2011, he was released from the club after making just two appearances, for a total of nine minutes and scoring no goals.

References

External links

Abdelhakim Laref at Footballdatabase

1985 births
Living people
Algerian footballers
Algerian expatriate footballers
Belgian footballers
Belgian people of Algerian descent
People from Relizane
Association football forwards
R.A.A. Louviéroise players
K.S.V. Roeselare players
Beerschot A.C. players
K.A.A. Gent players
Standard Liège players
JSM Béjaïa players
MC Alger players
K.M.S.K. Deinze players
Sportkring Sint-Niklaas players
K.F.C. Eendracht Zele players
Algerian Ligue Professionnelle 1 players
Belgian Pro League players